Bassing is a commune in the Moselle department in Grand Est in northeastern France.

History
Previous names:  Bessingen (1267), Bassigen (1267), Bessing (1553), Bensingen (1594), Bestingen (1665).

Population

See also
 Communes of the Moselle department

References

External links
 

Communes of Moselle (department)